Mary Long Alderson (June 19, 1860 - January 7, 1940) was an American suffragist, clubwoman, and writer.

Early life
Mary Long was born on June 19, 1860, in South Weymouth, Massachusetts, to Eliza Regan and John E. Long. Her parents were both Irish immigrants born in the 1830s, residing in Massachusetts at the time of Mary's birth. At the time of recording during the 1860 Census--which would have been gathered the year Mary was born--there were two other adults living in the household, also from Ireland. Mary was raised in Boston and met prominent women such as Louisa May Alcott. Mary was educated under the “Quincy Method” in Quincy, Massachusetts.

Career
Long worked as a teacher until 1887, when she met Matthew William Alderson (1855-1924). The following year, she became his second wife. The two were married in Braintree, Massachusetts, and settled in Bozeman, Montana. They would eventually have three daughters.

Journalist
Matt Alderson and his father published the Bozeman Avant Courier. Mary wrote for the Avant Courier, including  editorial content, specifically advocating against corsets and long skirts. She also wrote on botany, temperance, and women's suffrage. In this position, she was one of the few female members of the Montana Press Association. As a suffragette, Alderson also served as the editor of the WCTU Journal of Montana.

Activist
Alderson attended the 1893 World's Columbian Exposition in Chicago. There, she heard suffragist speakers including Susan B. Anthony. Alderson returned to Bozeman eager to organize for women's right to vote. She led the charge for women's suffrage in Montana, and the state granted Montana women the right to vote in 1914. Alderson was the recording secretary for the executive committee during the Second Annual Convention of the Montana Equal Suffrage Association in November 1896. She was also the recording secretary for the 1904 state convention of the Woman's Christian Temperance Union.  

Alderson was an active clubwoman. She was a member of the Woman's Christian Temperance Union (WCTU), serving as president of the Montana chapter from 1913 to 1916. She was the editor of the Montana WCTU Journal. She was also a member of the "Montana State Housekeepers Society" and the "Bozeman Society for the Promotion of Physical Culture and Correct Dress". Alderson was the Montana chairwoman of driving force behind the "Floral Emblem Campaign" which voted Lewisia rediviva, commonly known as the bitterroot, as the official state flower.

In 1930, Alderson resigned from the WCTU. She continued to be an outspoken activist on issues such as child welfare, education, and labor laws.

Death and legacy
Alderson died in Bozeman, Montana, on January 7, 1940, at the age of 79.

Her papers are part of the "Alderson Family Collection" housed at the Merrill G. Burlingame Archives and Special Collections of the Montana State University Library. This collection includes, among other items, diaries, letters, scrapbooks, and photographs created by or pertaining to the Alderson family.  A collection of Alderson's papers from 1894-1936 is held at the Montana Historical Society. This includes manuscripts for "A Half Century of Progress for Montana Women," biographical sketches on figures in Montana history, and three scrapbooks about the selection of the bitterroot as Montana's state flower.

Selected publications
 Alderson, Mary Long. n.d. Thirty-four years in the Montana Woman's Christian Temperance Union, 1896-1930. 
 Alderson, Mary Long. 1924. Matt W. Alderson, 1855-1924.
 Alderson, Mary Long. 1902. Montana's floral emblem -- Lewisia rediviva. [U.S.]: Rocky Mountain Magazine.

See also
 List of suffragists and suffragettes

References

External links

 Collection 0891, Alderson Family Papers, 1865-1939. Held at Montana State University's Archives and Special Collections.
 Collection 0708, William W. Alderson Diary, 1864-1879. Held at Montana State University's Archives and Special Collections.
 SC 122, Mary Long Alderson Papers, 1894-1936. Held at Montana Historical Society.
 Matt W. Alderson Photographs. Collection of photographs of Alderson and his family, including Mary Long. Held at Montana Historical Society.
 

1860 births
1940 deaths
Clubwomen
American suffragists
People from Norfolk County, Massachusetts
People from Bozeman, Montana
19th-century American newspaper editors
Women newspaper editors
20th-century American non-fiction writers
20th-century American women writers
Woman's Christian Temperance Union people
Notable residents of Montana